Mottet is a surname. It may refer to:

Benoît Mottet de La Fontaine (1745–1820), French navy officer and officer of colonies ministry
Charly Mottet (born 1962), French cyclist
Kacey Mottet Klein (born 1998), Swiss actress
Killian Mottet (born 1991), Swiss ice hockey player
Marvin Mottet (1930–2016), Roman Catholic priest in the Diocese of Davenport in Iowa 
Maxime Mottet (born 1991), Belgian trap shooter

See also
Mottet baronets, or Mottet Baronetcy of Liège, title in the Baronetage of England